, also known by his Chinese style name , was a royal of Ryukyu Kingdom.

Prince Ōzato was the second son of King Shō Shitsu, and his mother was Misato Aji-ganashi. He was the first head of a royal family called Mabuni Udun.

Prince Ōzato served as sessei from 1676 to 1686.

References

|-

1647 births
1687 deaths
Princes of Ryūkyū
Sessei
People of the Ryukyu Kingdom
Ryukyuan people
17th-century Ryukyuan people